The Washing of the Spears is a 1965 book by Donald R. Morris about the "Zulu Nation under Shaka" and the Anglo-Zulu War of 1879. It chronicles the rise of the Zulu nation under Shaka Zulu in the early 19th century and Chief Cetshwayo’s inevitable war with the British in 1879 as the colony of Natal pushed at the Zulu nation's borders.

Morris worked on the book during a five-year posting in Berlin. The first edition, published in 1966, was over 600 pages with detailed bibliography.  A second edition of the book, titled The Washing of the Spears: The rise and fall of the Zulu Nation, was published in 1998.

Notes

History books about the Anglo-Zulu War
Works about the Anglo-Zulu War
1966 non-fiction books